Albula glossodonta (roundjaw bonefish, shortjaw bonefish, Indo-Pacific bonefish, sharpjaw bonefish, or smallmouth bonefish) is a type of marine fish found in the Pacific Ocean. They grow up to 70 cm. Shortjaw bonefish are important to food security throughout the coastal Pacific where they are native as Pacific island communities depend on this fish for food. However, the species has become depleted throughout much of its range.

History
Bonefish were once believed to be a single species with a global distribution, however 9 different species have since been identified. There are three identified species in the Atlantic and six in the Pacific.

Description
Shortjaw bonefish may weight over 20 pounds.

Angling
Recreational angling for shortjaw bonefish is popular in Hawaii, Cook Islands, Christmas Island, and French Polynesia. Anglers must be cautious when angling in some Pacific destinations because of the high rates of post-release predation that released bonefish can experience by sharks. Reef sharks on sandy flats are highly capable predators that can detect injured or stressed bonefish and research has shown that high numbers of bonefish can be eaten very soon after release. When angling, bonefish should be brought in quickly with extremely limited handling. Faster release yields better outcomes for bonefish that are captured by anglers. Flats with high densities of sharks should be scrutinized by anglers before fishing.

References

Albuliformes
Fish of Hawaii
Taxa named by Peter Forsskål
Fish described in 1775